For the artist, see Postino (artist). For the movie, see Il Postino.

Postino is an application built for iOS[1], Android Facebook[2] social network, which allows users to create custom physical postcards and to send them worldwide. The user takes a new photo with the camera (or uploads one from the computer), writes a message and a signature, pick a destination address, and send the postcard. The photo and data are processed and a physical card is printed on high-quality photo paper and sent from the United States to any destination. An electronic-delivery option is also available.

How it works 

Users visually create their postcards' front side by using a local editor (on the iPhone or the Facebook application) which allows them to select and existing photo, crop, zoom-in/out it and position it inside one of the optional frames. When the front-side is ready, the user can write a custom greetings message for the back-side, draw a custom signature with the finger on the touchscreen (only for the iPhone version), select or write the destination address, and send the postcard.

All information are passed to a server-side processing service which composes the postcards, prints it on high-quality photo paper, and then passes it to a delivery partner which can send the postcard worldwide. Normal delivery times are 2–4 days for addresses in the United States or Canada, and 7–10 days for Europe or the rest of the world.

Sending a physical postcard requires the user to use a virtual stamp. Virtual stamps can be bought from PayPal.

A free electronic-delivery option is also available, which sends the postcards as e-mail to the recipient addresses.

See also 

Postcrossing

External links 

1.  Postino for iPhone
2. Postino for Facebook

IOS software
Android (operating system) software